Homoeocera is a genus of moths in the subfamily Arctiinae The genus was erected by Cajetan Felder in 1874.

Species

References

External links

Euchromiina
Moth genera